Giovanni Paoli, better known as Juan Pablos (1500?–1560 or 1561), a native of Lombardy, was the first documented printer in the Americas when he started printing in Mexico in 1539.

Biography

Giovanni Paoli was born in the region of Brescia around 1500.  He may have been trained in the same school as Aldus Manutius, but apart from that nothing is known about his early years. In 1536, Juan Cromberger wanted to establish a printing house in Mexico and sent Juan Pablos to Mexico City. Pablos departed from Seville on 12 June 1539 and arrived in October 1539, when he set up the company in the "casa de Juan Cromberger". Cromberger's name also appeared on all early publications in Mexico until 1545 even though he never visited Mexico and died in 1540. 

The first known book to be published in the Americas was the 1539 edition of the Breve y mas compendiosa doctrina Christiana en lengua Mexicana y Castellana by Juan de Zumárraga. Juan Pablos obtained the necessary patents and permissions to continue Cromberger's workshop as his own after the death of Cromberger in 1540, until his own death in 1560 or 1561, when he had printed at least 37 books. Pablos trained and employed the next generation of Mexican printers, including Pedro Ocharte, who was also his son-in-law, and Antonio de Espinosa, who started working with Pablos in 1554. Espinosa became the second printer in Mexico, in 1559. 

Juan Pablos was married to Geronima Gutierrez, who received the viceroyal printing privilege after his death. Their daughter Maria de Figueroa married Pedro Ocharte in 1561 or 1562, and they took over the company from Gutierrez in 1563.

Works published
1539: Breve y mas compendiosa doctrina Christiana en lengua Mexicana y Castellana by Juan de Zumárraga, a text in Spanish and Nahuatl (multiple editions)
1540: Manual de Adultos
1541: Relacion del espantable terremoto, a report on the 10 September 1541 earthquake that destroyed Guatemala City
1543: Doctrina breve muy provechosa by Juan de Zumárraga, intended for children
1544: Tripartito del Christianissimo y consolatorio doctor Juan Gerson, first Mexican book with woodcut illustrations
1544: Compedio breve (2 editions)
1544: Doctrina christiana (multiple editions)
1546: Cancienore Spiritual, the first book to carry the name of Juan Pablos instead of Juan Cromberger
1547: Regle Christiana breve
1547: Nuevo Vergel by Diego Bernal
1548: Ordenaças y copilacion de leyes
1548: Doctrina Christiana en lengua Huasteca by Diego de Guevara
1548: Nueva Espana. Legislacion by Antonio de Mendoza
1549: Copilacion breve de un tratado que se llama Mistica theologia by Saint Bonaventura
1550: Doctrina Christiana en lengua Mixteca by Benito Fernandez (reprinted three times)
1554: Recognitio. Summularum reverendi patri Ildephonsi by Alonso Gutiérrez
1554: Dialectica Resolutio cum textu Aristotelis
1554: Dialogi de Academia Mexicana by Francisco Cervantes de Salazar
1554: Vives by Francisco Cervantes de Salazar
1555: Vocabulario en lengua castellana y mexicana by Alonso de Molina
1556: Sumario Compendioso by Juan Diez, the first non-religious scientific book to be published outside Europe
1556: Costituciones del arzobiscopado y provincia de la muy insigne y muy leal ciudad de Tenuxtitlan Mexico de la Nueva Espana
1556: Costituciones Fratruum Heremitarum sancti patris nostri Augustini Hiponensis episcopi et doctoris ecclesiae together with the Ordinarium sacri ordinis heremitaru by Diego de Vertauillo and the Regula: the Ordinarium (80 pages) was the first book of music printed in the Americas
1556: Speculum Conjugiorum by Alonso Gutiérrez
1556: Catecismo y doctrina Christiana en idioma Utlateco by Francisco Marroquín
1557: Physica speculatio by Alonso Gutiérrez
1559: Dialogo de doctrina cristiana, Vocabulario and Thesoro spiritual, all three by Maturino Gilberti in lengua de Mechuacan
1560: Manuale Sacramentorum, the last work published by Pablos, 354 pages.

Notes

Year of birth unknown
1560 deaths
Businesspeople from Turin
People from Mexico City
Italian emigrants to Mexico
Italian printers
Year of birth uncertain
16th-century printers
16th-century Italian businesspeople
16th-century Spanish businesspeople